The Cold Deck may refer to:
 Glossary of poker terms#cold deck
 "The Cold Deck", a Judge Dredd story, part of Trifecta
 The Cold Deck (film), a 1917 American silent Western film
 Cold Deck, a 2015 Canadian thriller film